"A Kind of a Stopwatch" is a 1963 episode of the American television anthology series The Twilight Zone. In this episode, a man acquires a stopwatch which can stop time.

Opening narration

Plot
Patrick McNulty is a self-important, annoying man in his 40s. One day, he is summoned by his boss, Mr. Cooper. McNulty is delighted, believing that his frequent contributions to the suggestion box have earned him recognition. Cooper, however, says that all of McNulty's suggestions deal with fields of enterprise in which the company is not involved and fires McNulty for wasting his time.

McNulty goes to Joe Palucci's bar, where he drives away the other patrons with his opinions about a sporting event. Palucci requests that McNulty patronize another establishment, but McNulty ignores him and buys a drink for the sole remaining patron, Potts, a drunk who spews various phrases from times long past. In return, Potts gives McNulty his stopwatch. Thinking it an odd gift, McNulty quickly discovers that it pauses time for everyone and everything except for the watch holder.

McNulty tries to show Cooper the power of the stopwatch in the hopes of improving their company, but Cooper does not understand McNulty and dismisses him. Returning to the bar, McNulty tries to demonstrate the power of the watch to the customers, but does it in such a way that they do not understand again.

McNulty steps into a bank with the intention of robbing it, but drops the watch, which breaks and permanently freezes time. With no way to repair it, McNulty frantically begs for help from the frozen people around him.

Closing narration

Cast
Richard Erdman as Patrick Thomas McNulty
Herbie Faye as Joe Palucci, the bartender
Leon Belasco as Potts, the drunk who gives McNulty the stopwatch
Doris Singleton as Secretary to McNulty's boss Mr. Cooper
Roy Roberts as Mr. Cooper, McNulty's annoyed boss
Richard Wessel as Charlie, drinker in Palucci's bar
Ray Kellog as Fred, who delivers coffee to McNulty's office
Ken Drake as Daniel, last patron in Palucci's bar who tells McNulty, "Come on fella, we're trying to watch."Uncredited:
Sam Balter: sports announcer on TV in Polucci's bar
Al Silvani: one of the drinkers in Polucci's bar

One cast member, last-billed Ken Drake, had a credited bit part in an earlier episode of the original series, "A Hundred Yards Over the Rim" (April 1961).

Adaptation
The television episode was later adapted as an episode of The Twilight Zone Radio Dramas series under the title "A Kind of Stopwatch", featuring Lou Diamond Phillips in the lead role.

Related works
Ideas from this episode were used in "A Little Peace and Quiet", an episode in the 1985 revival of The Twilight Zone.

The episode has been parodied by a number of animated series, including in the Johnny Bravo episode "The Day the Earth Didn't Move Around Very Much"; the Simpsons 2003 Halloween episode "Treehouse of Horror XIV"; The Garfield Show episode "Time Master"; and the series finale of Futurama.

See also
List of The Twilight Zone (1959 TV series) episodes

References

Further reading
DeVoe, Bill. (2008). Trivia from The Twilight Zone. Albany, GA: Bear Manor Media. 
Grams, Martin. (2008). The Twilight Zone: Unlocking the Door to a Television Classic. Churchville, MD: OTR Publishing. 
Zicree, Marc Scott: The Twilight Zone Companion. Sillman-James Press, 1982 (second edition)

External links
The Rod Serling Archives at Ithaca College, The Twilight Zone, Season 5, Script 124, "A Kind of Stopwatch"

The Twilight Zone (1959 TV series season 5) episodes
1963 American television episodes
Television episodes written by Rod Serling